Wayne Weiler (December 9, 1934 in Phoenix, Arizona – October 13, 2005 in Phoenix, Arizona) was an American racecar driver.

Weiler started as a dirt track driver in Arizona in 1951.  He drove in the USAC Championship Car series from 1958 to 1961 with 19 starts.  He finished in the top ten 10 times, with his best finish in 3rd position, in 1960 at Phoenix.

Weiler competed in the Indianapolis 500 race in 1960 and 1961, with a best finish of 15th in 1961.

Weiler suffered a severe accident in a USAC sprint car race in Terre Haute, Indiana on June 11, 1961.  Despite many erroneous reports stating the accident ended his career, he returned to race, just not nationally or in USAC any longer. He raced primarily in Arizona and in midgets, from the late 1960s through 1973. He remained active as an owner and manager in auto racing up until his death.

Weiler died at age 70 from a heart attack.

Indy 500 results

World Championship career summary
The Indianapolis 500 was part of the FIA World Championship from 1950 through 1960. Drivers competing at Indy during those years were credited with World Championship points and participation. Wayne Weiler participated in 1 World Championship race but scored no World Championship points.

External links
Two-Time Indianapolis 500 Starter Weiler Dies At 70

1934 births
2005 deaths
Indianapolis 500 drivers
Racing drivers from Phoenix, Arizona